Ferenc Schmidt (6 November 1941 – 25 December 2011) was a Hungarian politician of German descent and was a member of the National Assembly (MP) from 1998 to 2010.

Career
He was born in Mór, Fejér County, on 6 November 1941. He finished Dózsa György Economical Secondary School in 1960.

He served as a representative of the German minority in the Assembly of Mór Local Government since 1994. He was also a member of the German Minority Municipality from that year. He served as chairman of the German Regional Minority Self-Government of Fejér County between 2007 and 2011.

He was a candidate for position of mayor of Mór in 2002. He was a deputy in the National Assembly as a Fidesz member from 1998 to 2010.

Awards
 Sándor Wekerle Prize (2007)

References

External links
 Országgyűlés biography

1941 births
2011 deaths
Fidesz politicians
Members of the National Assembly of Hungary (1998–2002)
Members of the National Assembly of Hungary (2002–2006)
Members of the National Assembly of Hungary (2006–2010)
Hungarian-German people
People from Mór